Grand Ayatollah Mohammad Rahmati Sirjani (Persian:  محمد رحمتی سیرجانی; born 1928) is an Iranian Twelver Shi'a Marja'.

He has studied in seminaries of Najaf, Iraq under Grand Ayatollah Muhsin al-Hakim and Abul-Qassim Khoei.

See also
List of Maraji

Notes

External links
Biography in Persian

Iranian grand ayatollahs
Iranian Islamists
Shia Islamists
1928 births
Living people

Fa:محمد رحمتی سیرجانی